Established in 2005 by the Usability Professionals Association, (now the User Experience Professionals Association), World Usability Day (WUD) or Make Things Easier Day occurs annually to promote the values of usability, usability engineering, user-centered design, universal usability, and every user's responsibility to ask for things that work better. The day adopts a different theme each year. Organizations, groups, or individuals are encouraged to hold events to mark the day, optionally according to that year's theme.

World Usability Day started as an idea springing from a discussion in the fall of 2004 between two UPA board member, Elizabeth Rosenzweig and Nigel Bevan.  They worked together with the UPA board to start World Usability Day and over the years, Elizabeth Rosenzweig kept it running.

World Usability Day Charter

Human error is a misnomer.  Technology today is too hard to use. A cell phone should be as easy-to-use as a doorknob. In order to humanize a world that uses technology as an infrastructure for education, healthcare, government, communication, entertainment, work, and other areas, we must agree to develop technologies in a way that serves people first.

Technology should enhance our lives, not add to our stress or cause danger through poor design or poor quality. It is our duty to ensure that this technology is effective, efficient, satisfying and reliable, and that it is usable by all people. This is particularly important for people with disabilities, because technology can enhance their lives, letting them fully participate in work, social and civic experiences. Technology should be developed knowing that human beings have certain limitations. Human error will occur if technology is not both easy-to-use and easy-to-understand. We need to reduce human error that results from bad design. We believe a united, coordinated effort is needed to develop reliable, easy-to- use technology to serve people in all aspects of their lives, including education, health, government, privacy, communications, work and entertainment. We must put people at the center of design, beginning with their needs and wants, and resulting in technology that benefits all of us. Therefore, we, the undersigned, agree to work together to design technology that helps human beings truly realize their potential, so that we can create a better world for ourselves and future generations.

We agree to observe World Usability Day each year, to provide a single worldwide day of events around the world that brings together communities of professional, industrial, educational, citizen and governmental groups for our common objective: to ensure that technology helps people live to their full potential and helps create a better world for all citizens everywhere.

Article 1 (Education) Wired and wireless schools are appearing everywhere. Students around the world benefit from low-cost, easy-to-use, reliable computing, Internet access, and telecommunication. Educational technology must be not only affordable and available, but must be usable by teachers, students and parents.
Article 2 (Health) Healthcare must be available to everyone around the world. Medical technology can improve health, but it must be easy-to-use: error in this arena is costly. Because we are what we eat, we need healthier food supplies that will improve the well being of people everywhere. Technology that produces better food for all must be built on research that keeps the whole person in mind.
Article 3 (Government)Governments around the globe seek to use new technology to better serve their citizens and increase participation in the civic experience. Citizens can pay taxes and take care of business online in many countries in the world; this same capability should be available to all, eliminating the digital divide that separates rich from poor or isolates social groups. Voting systems must ensure trust and confidence in elections. Technology that supports civic engagement must give all citizens equal access and opportunity, and must be easy to use and easy to understand by all citizens, including those with disabilities of any kind.
Article 4 (Communication) People need to connect with each other. We have more means than ever to communicate: phones, Internet, messaging and the printed medium. Technology that facilitates communication between people must be intuitive to use. It should have instructions that are easy to understand, and knobs, dials and buttons that do not require constant tuning.
Article 5 (Privacy and Security) As the use of technology grows, so do concerns about new forms of e-commerce, e-government and e-communication. We must build in appropriate safeguards to ensure that our interaction is secure, that children and others are protected, and that our systems are trustworthy.
Article 6 (Entertainment) Entertainment is not just for our spare time. People use entertainment for many reasons throughout their daily lives. The world of entertainment has embraced technology to give us photos, movies, music and games in new ways and on new devices. But, even amusement benefits from usability! Incomprehensible remote controls, confusing instructions and blinking VCR clocks speak to the need for improvement in our media. Usable entertainment systems will make the experience less tiring and frustrating...

History 

World Usability Day is held annually on the second Thursday of November. Details on past events can be found on the World Usability Day official website.

2005 
36 hours of content in 115 events around the world
Events in 35 countries
Approximately 8,000 people attended events worldwide
World Usability Day was started in November 2005 so we could change the world.  Each of us can make a difference, whether we are developers or consumers, our actions shape our world. A humanistic approach to technology development can help to steer us in a positive direction. User centered design and development puts people first.  When products and services are developed to enhance our lives, help us do our work more efficiently, and add enjoyment, everyone can benefit.

2006 
Day: 14 November 2006
Theme: Accessibility and "Making life easy"
Events in 39 countries
More than 40,000 participants
The largest percentage of participants were professionals involved in usability, design, engineering, technology, research, product development, government, and marketing.  However, there was strong outreach to general consumers and youth as well.  The range of events addressed issues in healthcare, education, communications, government, and more. From the U.S. Census Bureau to voting machine technology, to accessibility regulations, and implementation worldwide, the concept of “Making life easy” was fully integrated into presentations.

Additionally, World Usability Day New England 2006 focused on universal usability to enhance learning, effectiveness, and understanding for people of all abilities.

2007 
Day: 8 November 2007
Theme: Healthcare
Events in 41 countries
10,000 volunteers
Approximately 40,000 participants
Good usability in healthcare can mean the difference between life and death.  Whether it’s new medical devices or technologies; drug research, approval, or delivery; patient forms or medical record sharing; emergency disaster planning; increasing the functionality of hospitals; or everyday healthcare delivery, everyone is affected by usability in healthcare.

2008 
Theme: Transportation
Events in 43 countries
Approximately 50,000 participants
Transportation means moving products and people in its broadest sense. Usability in transportation speaks to the interaction of people and the vehicles, the challenges and issues infrastructure and modes for moving around in our environment. We spend time repeatedly, everyday getting our things and ourselves from point A to point B. It varies by day, by location, by time and by need and requires us to utilize many forms of transport. This year focused on exploring and creating awareness for how we interact with our transportation systems and opportunities for improving the usability of them.

2009 
Theme: Designing for a Sustainable World
Designing for a Sustainable World shows how usability can apply to all of what we do and build.  We look at all products and services – buildings, roads, or consumer products; business services or healthcare systems – throughout their life cycle. The impact focuses on our environment – energy, water, soil, and more. Are they user and environmentally friendly? These are questions we all must consider as we design, purchase, use, and dispose of products each and every day.

2010 
Theme: Designs, products and services that improve and facilitate communication
150 events in more than 40 countries
Social media enables billions of people to participate in online social activities, either as a reader, contributor, collaborator, or leader.  This raises several issues in designing for social media.  First, what motivates technology-mediated social participation?  Second, how to search for information in social media. Third, how to measure the usability of social media.  World Usability Day 2010 explored these issues, including understanding the context of use theory that can help researchers, designers, and managers to design and write better for social networks.

2011 
Theme: Education: Designing for Social Change
World Usability Day 2011 focused on how Design Education will help develop products and services that will impact social change.  Programs examined all products and services used for trach how usable design impact the world, whether it’s close at hand (organization), surrounding us (particular cultures/communicates) or from a global view: How does something designed in China, Scotland, India, or the United States, for example, have impact on other nations around the world?

2012 
Theme: Usability of Financial Systems
World Usability Day 2012 served as an impetus for creating greater awareness for designs, products and services that improve and facilitate financial systems around the world.

2013 
Day: 14 November 2013
Theme: Healthcare: Collaborating for Better Systems
The importance of user-centered design in healthcare is truly life or death. Whether it's new medical devices or technologies; drug research, approval or delivery; patient forms or medical record sharing; emergency disaster planning or increasing the functionality of hospitals and everyday healthcare delivery, everyone is affected in some way by the intersection of usability in healthcare. There are many commonalities, yet each region of the world faces its own set of unique challenges. We believe that focusing World Usability Day 2013 on healthcare will create a stronger awareness of these issues and lead to initiative that have long term impact on the quality of everyone's life.

2014 
Day: 13 November 2014
Theme: Engagement
User Experience is all about engagement. Technology, products and services are usable when they engage people. At work we strive to engage with those around us—whether they’re users, colleagues, or stakeholders. It means getting people on board with an idea, earning trust, and working toward mutual goals. We all know how challenging that can be. This is the year to think out of the box. How can you engage people to use technology products and services? What kind of design thinking needs to be incorporated, to keep people engaged? How can you engage those outside our field, to understand the importance of a good user experience? Can we engage people to help changes those things that are not working well?

2015 
Day: 12 November 2015
Theme: Innovation
At the 10th anniversary of the world usability day, 135 events were planned in 40 countries.

2016 
Day: 10 November 2016
Theme: Sustainability

2017 
Day: 9 November 2017
Theme: Inclusion

2018 
Day: 8 November 2018
Theme: Design for Good or Evil

2019 
Day: 14 November 2019
Theme: Design for the Future We Want

2020 
Day: 12 November 2020
Theme: Human–Centered AI

2021 

 Day: 11 November 2021
 Theme: Trust, Ethics and Integrity

2022 

 Day: 11 November 2022
 Theme: Health

References

November observances
Usability